The São Nicolau Island Opening Tournament (Portuguese: Torneio de Abertura de São Nicolau, Capeverdean Crioulo, ALUPEC or ALUPEK: Turnéu di Abertura di San Nikolau), is an opening tournament competition (equivalent to a league cup) played during the season in the island of São Nicolau, Cape Verde  The competition is organized by the São Nicolau Regional Football Association (Associação Regional de Futebol de São Nicolau, ARFSN).  Some seasons featured rounds of one portion, some seasons featured three rounds and two groups with the top club of each group in the final match.  It currently consists of seven rounds, a meeting with another club once.  The winner with the most points (sometimes in the final) is the winner.

SC Atlético, Belo Horizonte and Ultramarina won the most title numbering three, Talho only won once in 2004. Ultramarina was the second club to win a title in 2003 and Belo Horizonte probably the fourth to win a title in 2007. Atlético is the recent club to win a title for the season.  Belo Horizonte had the most in 2011 and 2016, From 2012 to 2015, Ultramarina shared it with Belo Horizonte and up to 2016 three clubs together with Atlético.  Belo Horizonte was the leader up to 2017 and three clubs has now three titles won.

Each of the three clubs won nearly 30% of the title total in 2017.

The 2017-18 season has been cancelled due to financial concerns.

Winners

Performance By Club

Performance by Municipality

See also
São Nicolau Island League
São Nicolau Cup
São Nicolau Super Cup

References

Sport in São Nicolau, Cape Verde
Football cup competitions in Cape Verde
2002 establishments in Cape Verde